Stockport Rugby Union Football Club is a rugby union club based in Stockport, Greater Manchester. They play in Regional 1 North West, following their promotion from  North 1 West in 2021–22.

History
Stockport RUFC  was founded in 1923 as Davenport R.U.F.C, the name changing in 1992. The club has made its way up the rugby pyramid in recent seasons, having been as low as the old North West 3 league at one point in the mid-1990s.

In 2006 the club won the Powergen Intermediate Cup, 11-6 versus Morley, where Nick Wroe was awarded man of the match after a dazzling display at Twickenham. During that successful season the club finished 1st in the North 2 West League gaining promotion to National 3 North.

In 2011, Stockport were crowned champions of National 3 North gaining promotion to National 2 North.  Six players were also selected to play for Cheshire RFU at the end of the season; Captain David Marwick, Vice Captain Andy Fuller, Tom Cruse, Jan Erik Anderson, Paul Ralph and Jamie Anthony.

During June 2012 Stockport R.U.F.C hosted the first annual Stockport 7s where they will recreate the success of the Glengarth Sevens which ran at the club for 21 years with the first being in 1967.

Honours
North 1 West Champions: 2021-22
North 2 West Champions: 1998–99
Cheshire Plate Winners: 1999
North Division 2 West Champions: 2005–06
Powergen Intermediate Cup Winners: 2006
North 2 (east v west) Promotion play-off winners: 2007–08
National League 3 North Champions: 2010–11
National League 3 (north v midlands) Promotion play-off winners: 2013–14

Stadium
The club plays their home matches at the Memorial Ground, Headlands Road in Bramhall, Stockport.

Since 1998 a marquee has been erected every summer on the 1st team pitch hosting classic pop acts like; Elkie Brooks, Procol Harum, Paul Jones, The Animals, Ruby Turner and Fairport Convention. In 2006 the main attraction were the Troggs who appeared with Marmalade and the Tremeloes. In 2009 The Bootleg Beatles made their second visit to the Marquee two years after their first visit.

References

External links
 Official Site

English rugby union teams
Rugby clubs established in 1923
Sport in Stockport